Pseudonaevia is a genus of fungi in the family Dermateaceae. This is a monotypic genus, containing the single species Pseudonaevia caricina.

See also
 List of Dermateaceae genera

References

External links
Pseudonaevia at Index Fungorum

Dermateaceae genera
Monotypic Helotiales genera